Wiay is the name of two uninhabited islands in the Hebrides, off the  west coast of Scotland.

 Wiay, Inner Hebrides, of Skye
 Wiay, Outer Hebrides, of the Uists